Brandon Joseph Winey (born January 27, 1978) is a former American football offensive tackle who played in the National Football League for the Washington Redskins and New York Giants. He played college football at Louisiana State University and was drafted in the sixth round of the 2001 NFL Draft by the Miami Dolphins. Winey attended Washington-Marion Magnet High School in Lake Charles, Louisiana. Winey was arrested for the shooting of LSU player Tahj Jones on April 12, 2014.

References

1978 births
Living people
Sportspeople from Lake Charles, Louisiana
American football offensive tackles
LSU Tigers football players
Washington Redskins players
New York Giants players